Boninsegna is an Italian surname. Notable people with the surname include:

Celestina Boninsegna (1877–1947), Italian opera singer
Roberto Boninsegna (born 1943), Italian footballer and manager

See also
Duccio di Buoninsegna

Italian-language surnames